HD 217382 is a suspected binary star system in the northern circumpolar constellation of Cepheus. It is faintly visible to the naked eye with an apparent visual magnitude of 4.70. The system is moving further away with a heliocentric radial velocity of +2.6 km/s. It is a candidate member of the Hyades supercluster and has a peculiar velocity of 9.2 km/s.

The visible component of this system is an evolved K-type giant star with a stellar classification of K4 III. It is a periodic variable with a frequency of a cycle every 10.64724 days and an amplitude of 0.0041 in magnitude. The star has an estimated 37 times the radius of the Sun and is radiating 318 times the Sun's luminosity from its enlarged photosphere at an effective temperature of about 4,105 K.

References

K-type giants
Cepheus (constellation)
Durchmusterung objects
217382
113116
8748